Daniel Zalewski (born 17 January 1992) is a Polish bobsledder. He competed in the FIBT World Championships 2013 in St. Moritz. He competed at the 2014 Winter Olympics in Sochi, in four-man bobsleigh.

References 

1992 births
Living people
Polish male bobsledders
Bobsledders at the 2014 Winter Olympics
Olympic bobsledders of Poland
Place of birth missing (living people)